"Norman" is a popular song written by John D. Loudermilk. Recorded by Sue Thompson in 1961, the song reached No. 3 on the Billboard Hot 100. The next year, Carol Deene released her version of the song in the United Kingdom, where it reached No. 24 on the UK Singles Chart. Guy Lombardo recorded a
version of the song for his 1962 Decca LP By Special Request.

Chart performance

References

External links
 Lyrics of this song
 

1961 songs
1961 singles
1962 singles
Sue Thompson songs
Songs written by John D. Loudermilk